Errion Donaldson Charles (born 7 December 1965) is a sportsman from the Turks and Caicos Islands who has represented his nation at international level at both association football and cricket, despite being born on the neighbouring island of Saint Vincent.

Cricket career
In cricket, Charles first played for the Turks and Caicos Islands in the 2003/04 Americas Affiliates Championship against the Bahamas.  He later played a single Twenty20 match for the Turks and Caicos Islands against Montserrat in the 2008 Stanford 20/20 at the Stanford Cricket Ground, a match in which he captained the team.  He was dismissed for 4 runs in this match by Trevor Semper, with the Turks and Caicos Islands making just 67 runs in their twenty overs.  Montserrat went on to win the match by 9 wickets.

Football career
Charles made his debut for Turks and Caicos in the country's first official international game, a February 1999 Copa Caribe match against the Bahamas and earned a total of 7 caps, scoring no goals. He represented his country in 4 World Cup qualification games.

References

External links

Errion Charles at ESPNcricinfo
Errion Charles at CricketArchive

1965 births
Living people
People from Saint Vincent (Antilles)
Association football forwards
Turks and Caicos Islands footballers
Turks and Caicos Islands international footballers
Cheshire Hall players
Turks and Caicos Islands cricketers
Turks and Caicos Islands cricket captains
Saint Vincent and the Grenadines emigrants to the Turks and Caicos Islands